Neobuprestis is a genus of beetles in the family Buprestidae, containing the following species:

 Neobuprestis albosparsa Carter, 1924
 Neobuprestis frenchi (Blackburn, 1892)
 Neobuprestis marmorata (Blackburn, 1892)
 Neobuprestis peroni (Gory & Laporte, 1838)
 Neobuprestis trisulcata Carter, 1932

References

Buprestidae genera